The Exchange Bank Building was built in 1880 as the most prominent commercial building in Farmington in the U.S. state of Minnesota. It is the city's second-oldest commercial building. The Italianate and Romanesque brick building is located at 320 Third Street and was designed by Saint Paul's Augustus Gauger.

References

Bank buildings on the National Register of Historic Places in Minnesota
Buildings and structures in Dakota County, Minnesota
National Register of Historic Places in Dakota County, Minnesota